Sino-Vietnamese is often used to mean:

 Sino-Vietnamese vocabulary, the portion of the Vietnamese vocabulary of Chinese origin or using of morphemes of Chinese origin.

People of Chinese origin in Vietnam:
 Hoa people or "Overseas Chinese"
 Ngái people, rural-dwelling Hakka Chinese people, counted separately from the Hoa people
 San Diu people or "Mountain Yao"/"Mountain Chinese ", Yao people who speak an archaic dialect of Cantonese as well as Iu Mien

People of Vietnamese origin in China:
 Gin people, one of the 55 officially recognised ethnic minorities of China, whose native language is Vietnamese
 Vietnamese people in Hong Kong

Conflicts:
 Sino-Vietnamese War of 1979

Language and nationality disambiguation pages